In mathematics, the q-Jacobi polynomials may be the
Big q-Jacobi polynomials
Continuous q-Jacobi polynomials
Little q-Jacobi polynomials